Engineer Mountain is a  mountain summit located in San Juan County, Colorado, United States. It is part of the San Juan Mountains range which is a subset of the Rocky Mountains, and is west of the Continental Divide. Engineer Mountain is a prominent landmark set 1.5 mile immediately west of Coal Bank Pass, and is visible from multiple viewpoints along Highway 550, making it one of the most photographed mountains in the San Juans. It is situated 11 miles southwest of the community of Silverton, on land managed by San Juan National Forest. Neighbors include Snowdon Peak seven miles to the east, and Twilight Peak, five miles to the southeast.

Climate 
According to the Köppen climate classification system, Engineer Mountain is located in an alpine subarctic climate zone with long, cold, snowy winters, and cool to warm summers. Due to its altitude, it receives precipitation all year, as snow in winter, and as thunderstorms in summer, with a dry period in late spring. Precipitation runoff from the mountain drains into tributaries of the Animas River.

Gallery

See also

References

External links 

 Weather forecast: Engineer Mountain
 Engineer Mountain drone video: YouTube

Mountains of San Juan County, Colorado
San Juan Mountains (Colorado)
Mountains of Colorado
North American 3000 m summits
San Juan National Forest